King Wei of Qi, whose personal name was Tian Yinqi (田因齊), was the king of the northern Chinese state of Qi during the Warring States period, when Qi was one of the most powerful states in China. He reigned from 356 to 320 BC. or according to another source from 378 to 343 BC. He was the first ruler of Qi to style himself "king".

His successor was King Xuan of Qi. In the Intrigues of the Warring States, the strategist Su Qin is quoted as telling the king of Qin: "Kings Wei and Xuan of Qi were the worthiest rulers of their age. Their power was great and their lands were broad. Their states were wealthy and their citizens capable. Their generals were aggressive and their troops strong."

King Wei was judicious and measured in his actions toward his subordinates. At one point he was told repeatedly by his spies that one of his generals, Zhangzi, had surrendered to the enemy, Qin. King Wei refused to believe that Zhangzi had deserted. Sure enough, "a short while later it was reported that Qi had won a great victory. The king of Qin proclaimed himself a vassal of the western borders and made his apologies to Qi." King Wei said that he always knew Zhangzi was faithful and cited this story in his defence. 

According to another story, King Wei proclaimed that "To all ministers, officers and citizens who criticize my faults in front of me, they will get the highest reward; those who remonstrate with me in writing will be given the next highest reward, and to those who overhear criticism of me and convey it to my ears will go the least reward." It was said that initially, "the doorway to the king's chamber looked like a marketplace" but after a year, "none who spoke to the king had petitions to present" [because the problems had already been solved]. "When [the states of] Yan, Zhao, Han and Wei heard of this they all came to court at Qi."

King Wei employed Sun Bin as chief military advisor. Sun Bin had been punished with mutilation of his knees in Wei at the instigation of his enemy Pang Juan. King Wei's commander Tian Ji recruited him to come to Qi. As Sun Bin could not sit on a horse, he refused when King Wei offered him the actual command of the army. Sun Bin wrote Sun Bin's Art of War, in which King Wei and Tian Ji question Sun Bin on strategy and tactics. Sun Bin was influential in devising the strategy for the Qi triumph at the Battle of Maling in 342 BC, which considerably weakened the rival state of Wei. Pang Juan died there. "Late in his reign, he sent out armies against Qin and Zhao."

King Wei was the caster of the ritual bronze vessel bearing the earliest attestation of the Yellow Emperor, the Chen Hou Yinqi dui (陳侯因齊敦).

His son Tian Ying (田嬰) was the father of Lord Mengchang.

Family
Queens:
 Queen Wei

Concubines:
 Wey Ji, of the Ji clan of Wey, the mother of Prince Jiaoshi
 Yu Ji, of the Yu clan, personal name Juanzhi

Sons:
 First son, Crown Prince Pijiang (350–301 BC), ruled as King Xuan of Qi from 319–301 BC
 Second son, Prince Ying, the father of Lord Mengchang
 Known by his title, Lord Jingguo
 Served as the Prime Minister of Qi
 Granted the fiefdom of Xue in 322 BC
 Prince Jiaoshi

Ancestry

References

Monarchs of Qi (state)
4th-century BC Chinese monarchs
Chinese kings
370s BC births
Year of birth unknown
320 BC deaths